This is a list of first generation Finnish Tatar names.

The list contains male Tatar names, which were used in Finland by Tatars who were born in the villages of Nizhny Novgorod Governorate, especially Aktuk, during the second half of 19th century. They were Mishar Tatars who settled in Finland in the late 1800s and early 1900s.

According to researcher Antero Leitzinger, certain names or versions of names may be missing from the list. The spelling of the names also varies a lot.

Some names appear as both first names and surnames. As their surnames, these Tatar men usually used either the name of their father or grandfather. Most of them removed the Russian suffixes/patronyms, such as -off/ov around the time of the independence of Finland (1917).

The Tatars in Finland used the Arabic script before adopting the Latin script. This transition started in 1930s.

The list has in parentheses the proper Literary Tatar version of each name, both in Cyrillic and Latin alphabet (some are missing). In Mishar Dialect, letters/sounds Ğ and Q are not used.

Names that come from Arabic, like for example “Ğali” and ”Ğomär” are written as such in the Cyrillic script (Гали/Гомәр), but due to influence of Tatar vowel harmony, they appear also with an extra ä/ö in the Latin alphabet (Ğäli/Ğömär).

First names 

 Abdulhak (Габделхак; Ğäbdelxaq/Ğəbdelxaq)
 Abdullah/Abdulla (Габдулла; Ğabdulla/Abdulla)
 Abdulkebir (Габделкәбир; Ğäbdelqäbir/Ğəbdelqəbir)
 Abdrasak (Габдрәзәк; Ğäbdräzäq/Ğəbdrəzəq)
 Abbas (Габбәс; Ğäbbäs/Ğəbbəs)
 Abdulgafur (Габделгафур; Ğäbdelğafur/Ğəbdelğafur)
 Abdulgaffar (Габделгаффар; Ğäbdelğaffar/Ğəbdelğaffar)
 Abdulhai (Габделхәй; Ğäbdelxäy/Ğəbdelxəy
 Abdulhamid (Габделхәмит; Ğäbdelxämit/Ğəbdelxəmit)
 Abdraham
 Abduldeyyin
 Abdulkuddus (Габделкотдус; Ğäbdelqotdus/Ğəbdelqotdus)
 Afzaletdin (Әфзалетдин; Äfzaletdin/Əfzaletdin)
 Ahmedshan/Ahmedcan (Әхмәтҗан; Äxmätcan/Əxmətcan)
 Aisja/Aisa (Гайсә; Ğäysä/Ğəysə)
 Aisatulla (Гайзәтулла; Ğäyzätulla/Ğəyzətulla)
 Ali (Гали; Ğäli/Ğəli)
 Alautdin (Галәветдин/Галәэтдин; Ğäläwetdin/Ğäläetdin/Ğələwetdin/Ğələetdin)
 Amirdshan (Гамирҗан; Ğämircan/Ğəmircan)
 Bedi (Бәди; Bädi/Bədi)
 Bedretdin (Бәдретдин; Bädretdin/Bədretdin)
 Besher (Бәшәр; Bäşär/Bəşər)
 Bilaletdin (Билалетдин)
 Burhan (Борһан; Borhan)
 Cemaletdin
 Fattah (Фәттах; Fättax/Fəttax)
 Fazlulla (Фәзлулла; Fäzlulla/Fəzlulla)
 Fedjahetdin
 Feshetdin (Фәсхетдин; Fäsxetdin/Fəsxetdin)
 Fehretdin (Фәхретдин; Fäxretdin/Fəxretdin)
 Hairetdin/Hairedin (Хәйретдин; Xäyretdin/Xəyretdin)
 Hakim (Хәким; Xäkim/Xəkim)
 Hamze (Хәмзә; Xämzä/Xəmzə)
 Hasan/Hasän (Хәсән; Xäsän/Xəsən)
 Halilulla (Хәлилулла; Xälilulla/Xəlilulla)
 Husnetdin (Хөснетдин; Xösnetdin)
 Husainshah (Хөсәенша; Xösäyenşa/Xösəyenşa)
 Husein (Хөсәен; Xösäyen/Xösəyen)
 Ibrahim (Ибраһим)
 Idiatulla
 Imametdin (Гыймаметдин; Ğimametdin/İmametdin)
 Imadetdin (Гыймадетдин; Ğimadetdin/İmadetdin)
 Ismail (Исмәгыйль; İsmäğil/İsməğil)
 Ishak (Исхак; İsxaq)
 Kafiatulla  (Гафиатулла; Ğafiatulla)
 Kamal (Камал)
 Kemaletdin
 Kemal
 Letfulla (Лотфулла; Lotfulla)
 Mahmud (Мәхмүт; Mäxmüt/Məxmüt)
 Meyletdin
 Mirjakub (Мирякуп/Мирякуб; Miryakup/Miryakub)
 Mustafa (Мостафа; Mostafa)
 Minashetdin (Минһаҗетдин; Minhacetdin)
 Muhetdin (Мөхетдин; Möxetdin)
 Mirsiaf (Мирсаяф; Mirsayaf)
 Muhamedin (Мөхәммәтдин; Möxämmätdin/Möxəmmətdin)
 Nisametdin (Низаметдин; Nizametdin)
 Nuretdin (Нуретдин)
 Osman (Госман; Ğosman)
 Safa (Сафа)
 Safiullah/Safiulla (Сафиулла)
 Sadik (Садыйк; Sadıyq/Sadıyk)
 Salahetdin (Сәләхетдин; Säläxetdin/Sələxetdin)
 Sadri (Садри)
 Safer (Җәгъфәр; Cäğfär/Cəğfər)
 Samaletdin (Җәмәлетдин; Cämäletdin/Cəməletdin)
 Sarif (Зариф; Zarif)
 Şelaletdin (Җәләлетдин; Cäläletdin/Cələletdin)
 Semiulla (Сәмигулла; Sämiğulla/Səmiğulla)
 Seifetdin (Сәйфетдин; Säyfetdin/Səyfetdin)
 Siddik (Ситдыйк; Sitdıyq/Sitdıyk)
 Silaletdin
 Sjöfär (Зөфәр; Zöfär/Zöfər)
 Suleiman (Сөләйман; Söläyman/Söləyman)
 Tashbulat/Taschbulat (Ташбулат; Taşbulat)
 Veli (Вәли; Wäli/Wəli)
 Veli Ahmed (Вәлиәхмәт; Wäliäxmät/Wəliəxmət)
 Yakub (Якуп/Якуб)
 Yusuf (Йосыф; Yosıf)
 Ymär (Гомәр; Ğömär/Ğömər)
 Zeynülbeshar (Зәйнелбәшәр; Zäynelbäşär/Zəynelbəşər)
 Zinnetullah/Zinnetulla (Зиннәтулла; Zinnätulla/Zinnətulla)

Surnames 
In Russia, Tatar surnames have suffixes ov/ev/in (for females ova/eva/ina).
 Abdrahim (Габдрәхим; Ğäbdräxim/Ğəbdrəxim)
 Abdulkerimoff (Габделкәрим; Ğäbdelkärim/Ğəbdelkərim)
 Ahsen/Ahsen Böre (Әхсән Бүре; Äxsän/Əxsən Büre)
 Ahmedshan/Ahmedcan (Әхмәтҗан; Äxmätcan/Əxmətcan)
 Aimadetdin (Гыймадетдин; Ğimadetdin/İmadetdin)
 Ainetdin (Гайнетдин; Ğäynetdin/Ğəynetdin)
 Ainulla (Гайнулла; Ğäynulla/Ğəynulla)
 Akbulat (Акбулат; Aqbulat)
 Alautdin (Галәветдин/Галәэтдин; Ğäläwetdin/Ğäläetdin/Ğələwetdin/Ğələetdin)
 Alkara (Алкара; Alqara)
 Ali (Гали; Ğäli/Ğəli)
 Alimoff (Галим; Ğälim/Ğəlim)
 Arifdshan (Гарифҗан; Ğärifcan/Ğərifcan)
 Arifulla/Arifullen (Гарифулла; Ğärifulla/Ğərifulla)
 Aziz (Газиз; Ğäziz/Ğəziz)
 Badautdin/Badaudin
 Baibulat (Байбулат; Baybulat)
 Bavautdin
 Bedretdin (Бәдретдин; Bädretdin/Bədretdin)
 Beshar (Бәшәр; Bäşär/Bəşər)
 Bilaletdin (Билалетдин)
 Daher (Таһир; Tahir)
 Devlethan (Дәүләтхан; Däwlätxan/Dəwlətxan)
 Eksan (Әксән; Äqsän/Əqsən)
 Fethulla/Fathullah/Fenel (Фәтхулла; Fätxulla/Fətxulla)
 Fähretdin/Fere (Фәхретдин; Fäxretdin/Fəxretdin)
 Gubeidulla (Гобәйдулла; Ğöbäydulla/Ğöbəydulla)
 Hairetdin/Hairedin (Хәйретдин; Xäyretdin/Xəyretdin)
 Hairulla (Хәйрулла; Xäyrulla/Xəyrulla)
 Hakim (Хәким; Xäkim/Xəkim)
 Hakimdshan/Hakimsan/Hakimcan (Хәкимҗан; Xäkimcan/Xəkimcan)
 Hamidulla/Hamidullen (Хәмидулла; Xämidulla/Xəmidulla)
 Hasan (Хәсән; Xäsän/Xəsən)
 Hisametdin (Хисаметдин; Xisametdin)
 Hudaibirdi (Ходайбирде; Xodaybirde)
 Husnetdin (Хөснетдин; Xösnetdin)
 Ibrahim (Ибраһим; İbrahim)
 Imaditdin (Гыймадетдин; Ğimadetdin/İmadetdin)
 Imametdin (Гыймаметдин; Ğimametdin/İmametdin)
 Ismail (Исмәгыйл; İsmäğil/İsməğil)
 Issatulla (Гыйззәтулла; Ğizzätulla/Ğizzətulla)
 Josepoff/Josipov (Йосып; Yosıp)
 Kaader (Кадыйр; Qadıyr/Kadıyr)
 Kafiatulla (Гафиатулла; Ğafiatulla)
 Kanykoff/Kanuk (Каныйк; Qanıyq/Kanıyk)
 Karatau (Каратау; Qarataw/Karataw)
 Korbangali/Kurbanali (Корбангали; Qorbanğäli/Qorbanğəli)
 Muhamedin (Мөхәммәтдин; Möxämmätdin/Möxəmmətdin)
 Muhamedshan (Мөхәммәтҗан; Möxämmätcan/Möxəmmətcan)
 Muhammadieff (Мөхәммәт; Möxämmät/Möxəmmət)
 Nasibulla/Nasibullen (Насыйбулла/Нәсыйбулла;  Nasıybulla/Nəsıybulla)
 Nasretdin (Насретдин; Nasretdin)
 Neuman  (Ногман; Noğman)
 Nisametdin (Низаметдин; Nizametdin)
 Osman (Госман; Ğosman)
 Rahmatulla (Рәхмәтулла; Räxmätulla/Rəxmətulla)
 Saadetdin (Сәгьдетдин/Сәгадетдин; Säğdetdin/Säğädetdin/Səğədetdin/Səğdetdin)
 Saber/ Sabir (Сабир)
 Sadik (Садыйк; Sadıyq/Sadıyk)
 Sadri  (Садри)
 Salah (Сәләх; Säläx)
 Salavat (Салават; Salawat)
 Sali (Сәли; Säli/Səli)
 Samaletdin/Schamaletdin (Җәмәлетдин; Cämäletdin/Cəməletdin)
 Samarhan (Сәмәрхан; Sämärxan/Səmərxan)
 Samlihan (Самлихан; Samlixan)
 Schakir / Şakir (Шакир)
 Seifetdin (Сәйфетдин; Säyfetdin/Səyfetdin)
 Seifulla (Сәйфулла; Säyfulla/Səyfulla)
 Sekam (Сәкам; Säqam/Səqam)
 Siaetdin (Зыятдин; Zıyatdin)
 Suleiman (Сөләйман; Söläyman/Söləyman)
 Talus
 Tashbulat/Taschbulat  (Ташбулат; Taşbulat)
 Toktamesh (Туктамыш; Tuqtamış/Tuktamış)
 Tuganay (Туганай; Tuğanay)
 Vahid (Ваһит; Wahit)
 Virgas
 Wafin (Вафа; Wafa). 

The most common surnames among the Finnish Tatar community in 1970 were: Samaletdin, Bedretdin, Ali, Saadetdin, Hairetdin, Ainetdin, Hamidulla/Hamidullen, Schakir, Hasan, Arifulla/Arifullen, Sadik, Alkara, Asis, Beshar, Osman, Nisametdin, Fethulla and Wafin.

See also 
 Finnish Tatars
 Tatar language
 Tatar alphabet

Sources 
 Leitzinger, Antero: Mishäärit - Suomen vanha islamilainen yhteisö. Kirja-Leitzinger, 1996, Helsinki. .
 Bedretdin, Kadriye: Tugan Tel: Kirjoituksia Suomen tataareista. Suomen Itämainen Seura, 2011, Helsinki. .

Citations 

Names by culture
Tatar language